Henry Hobart may refer to:

Sir Henry Hobart, 1st Baronet (died 1625), English Lord Chief Justice of the Common Pleas
Sir Henry Hobart, 4th Baronet (c. 1658–1698), English MP for King's Lynn, Thetford, Norfolk and Bere Alston
Henry Hobart (MP) (1738–1799), British MP for Norwich 1786–1799
Henry Hobart (priest) (1774–1846), Dean of Windsor
Henry Hobart (producer) (1888–1951), American film producer
H. W. Hobart, British socialist and trade unionist